Blakney is a surname. Notable people with the surname include:

Roderick Blakney (born 1976), American-born Bulgarian basketball player
Ryan Blakney (born 1985), American baseball umpire

See also
Blackney
Blakeney (surname)